Schefflera morototoni (yagrumo macho; syn. Didymopanax morototoni (Aubl.) Decne. & Planch., Didymopanax morototoni var. angustipetalum March; Panax morototoni Aublet; Sciadophyllum paniculatum Britton ) is a timber tree  native to southern Mexico, the Greater Antilles, Central America, and South America.  It grows in a variety of habitats, such as the Caatinga, Cerrado, and Amazon Rainforest of Brazil.

References

External links
Schefflera morototoni

morototoni
Trees of Mexico
Trees of South America
Taxobox binomials not recognized by IUCN